Kenneth Nelson Nuttall (19 February 1942 – 21 December 1969) was a male cyclist who competed for England.

Cycling career
He represented England in the road race at the 1962 British Empire and Commonwealth Games in Perth, Western Australia.

He rode for the Manchester Wheelers and was runner-up in the British National Road Race Championships.

References

1942 births
1969 deaths
English male cyclists
Cyclists at the 1962 British Empire and Commonwealth Games
Commonwealth Games competitors for England